Rapho Township is a township in northwestern Lancaster County, Pennsylvania, United States. The population was 12,058 at the 2020 census.

History
The Kauffman's Distillery Covered Bridge, Mount Hope Estate, Forry's Mill Covered Bridge, and Siegrist's Mill Covered Bridge are listed on the National Register of Historic Places.

Geography
It is named after Raphoe, County Donegal, Ireland. Unincorporated communities in the township include Mastersonville, Union Square, Old Line, Naumanstown, Sporting Hill, and Newtown.

Demographics

As of the census of 2000, there were 8,578 people, 3,075 households, and 2,398 families living in the township.  The population density was 180.5 people per square mile (69.7/km).  There were 3,185 housing units at an average density of 67.0/sq mi (25.9/km).  The racial makeup of the township was 97.72% White, 0.29% African American, 0.08% Native American, 0.80% Asian, 0.51% from other races, and 0.59% from two or more races. Hispanic or Latino of any race were 0.80% of the population.

There were 3,075 households, out of which 35.0% had children under the age of 18 living with them, 70.5% were married couples living together, 4.7% had a female householder with no husband present, and 22.0% were non-families. 18.6% of all households were made up of individuals, and 7.0% had someone living alone who was 65 years of age or older.  The average household size was 2.76 and the average family size was 3.17.

In the township the population was spread out, with 27.1% under the age of 18, 7.5% from 18 to 24, 28.1% from 25 to 44, 25.6% from 45 to 64, and 11.7% who were 65 years of age or older.  The median age was 38 years. For every 100 females, there were 103.0 males.  For every 100 females age 18 and over, there were 98.4 males.

The median income for a household in the township was $50,063, and the median income for a family was $55,625. Males had a median income of $36,935 versus $25,402 for females. The per capita income for the township was $20,412.  About 3.0% of families and 4.1% of the population were below the poverty line, including 2.9% of those under age 18 and 6.4% of those age 65 or over.

References

External links

Populated places established in 1721
Townships in Lancaster County, Pennsylvania
Townships in Pennsylvania
1721 establishments in Pennsylvania